A referendum on the status of the island was held in Puerto Rico on 14 November 1993. Voters were given the choice between being a Commonwealth, statehood or independence. A plurality of voters voted for Commonwealth status, with a voter turnout of 73.5%.

Results

By municipality

References

1993 referendums
1993
1993 in Puerto Rico
Puerto Rico
November 1993 events in North America
Multiple-choice referendums